Makkah (814) is an  of the Royal Saudi Navy.

Development and design 

The ships' combat system, produced by Armaris (a Direction des Constructions Navales/Thales Group joint venture), is armed with Aster 15 surface-to-air missiles (SAM) launched from SYLVER vertical launchers (SYLVER - SYstème de Lancement VERtical). As with the La Fayette class, the primary offensive weapon is the anti-surface Exocet missile. The ships' main gun is the OTO Melara 76 mm super-rapid firing gun replacing the modèle 100 TR  automatic gun of the La Fayette. There are also four aft-mounted  torpedo tubes, firing DTCN F17 heavyweight anti-submarine torpedoes.

Construction and career 
Makkah was launched on 20 July 2001 at the DCNS dockyard in Lorient and commissioned on 3 April 2004.

Al Riyadh-class frigates
Three Al Riyadh-class frigates have been built:
 Al Riyadh (812) the lead ship commissioned in 2002
 Makkah (814) commissioned in 2004
 Al Dammam (816) commissioned in 2004

References

2001 ships
Ships built in France
Al Riyadh-class frigates
Ships of the Royal Saudi Navy